Gromart S.p.A., traded as Grom, is an Italian gelato company based in Turin. Grom's first Italian store was established in 2003 by Federico Grom and Guido Martinetti. 
It had further expanded internationally and established branches in several regions, namely New York City, Los Angeles, Malibu, Paris, Jakarta, Osaka, Dubai and London.

Born from an initial investment of 32,500 euros per shareholder, in 2009 the company achieved a turnover of 16 million euros. In 2011, revenues reached 23 million.

On 1 October 2015, the consumer goods international Unilever acquired the company for an undisclosed price.

Grom has slowly closed a number of stores, including New York, Los Angeles, Century City, Modena and Hong Kong, while opening new ones including Prague.

References

External links

 

Ice cream parlors
Food and drink companies of Italy
Companies based in Turin
Italian companies established in 2003
Restaurants established in 2003
Unilever brands
Italian brands